Kamienny Jaz  is a village in the administrative district of Gmina Chojna, within Gryfino County, West Pomeranian Voivodeship, in north-western Poland, close to the German border.

For the history of the region, see History of Pomerania.

Notable residents
 Peter van Eyck (1911–1969), actor

References

Kamienny Jaz